Night in Manhattan (1937) is a short musical film, starring Glenn Ford (in his first screen role) and directed by Herbert Moulton.

Plot
A gentleman Emcee (Ford), is the host of a series of musical acts, making his professional debut, a tap dancer, two good singers and a dancer, which ends with a montage of life, in a Manhattan nightclub.

Cast

External links  

1937 films
1937 musical films
American short films
American black-and-white films
American musical films
1937 short films
1930s English-language films
1930s American films